Alexander Zonjic (Serbian Cyrillic: Александар Зоњић; born April 30, 1951) is a flutist born in Windsor, Ontario, who performs both light jazz and classical compositions in the United States, based in Detroit, Michigan.

He is the son of a Greek mother and a Serbian émigré father who left the war-torn Yugoslavia before Tito's communists took over. He was educated in Windsor where he graduated from University of Windsor in 1975 and continued studying with Ervin Monroe, a distinguished first flutist with the Detroit Symphony Orchestra.

Throughout the 1980s, Continuing to live in Windsor with his wife, Lorraine, and son, Alex Jr., Zonjic performed regularly in Detroit-area clubs such as Baker's Keyboard Lounge, Alexanders, and Murdock's.

Discography
1978: Alexander Zonjic 
1981: The Classical Album 
1987: When Is It Real? 
1988: Romance With You (Optimism)
1988: Elegant Evening (Inner City, 1988)
1991: Neon (Reprise)
1993: Passion (Reprise, 1993)
1995: Pipers Holiday (Hi-Falutin Music)
2001: Reach for the Sky (Heads Up)
2004: Seldom Blues (Heads Up)
2009: Doin' the D (Heads Up International)
2020: Playing It Forward (Hi-Falutin)

References

 M. Moten, "Alexander Zonjic: Detroit's Adopted Son" Faces of Detroit Fall 2006

External links
 Official website Requires Macromedia Flash.

1951 births
Living people
Smooth jazz flautists
Canadian jazz flautists
Canadian classical flautists
Optimism Records artists
Heads Up International artists
Inner City Records artists
Musicians from Windsor, Ontario
Canadian people of Serbian descent